List of Latin place names used as specific names
A list of place names, used in Latin descriptions and, after the development of binomial nomenclature, as specific names in the natural sciences.

A
abancayense Abancay, Peru
abitaguense Cerros de Abitagua, Ecuador
abyssinica  Abyssinia
acadiensis northeastern North America
adoensis Aden, Arabia
aegyptiacum Egypt
aethiopicum Ethiopia
agavacense Agavaca province, Peru
ajuscoense Ajusco, Mexico
alaica Alai Mountains, Kyrgyzstan and Tajikistan
albarracinensis Albarracín in Spain
aldabrense Aldabra
amatymbica of the Thembu people of Kaffraria
amazonium Amazonia
amboniensis Ambon Island
amurensis Amur River
andohahelensis Andohahela, southeast Madagascar
anglicus England
angolensis Angola
arabicum Arabia
ardjunensis  Ardjuna, Sumatra
arvensis "of the fields"
ascalonicum Ashkelon
atlantica Atlas Mountains
australis Southern Hemisphere, Southern
ayacuchense Ayacucho, Perú
ayavacense Havana

B
barbadensis Barbados
batangense Batang, China
berolinensis Berlin
bonariensis Buenos Aires, Argentina
bononiensis Bologna
borealis Northern Hemisphere, Northern
brasiliensis Brazil
britannicus Great Britain
butuoense Butuo, Sichuan, China

C
cairica Cairo
camaldulensis Camaldoli monastery near Naples 
canariensis Canary Islands
canedana, canadensis Canada
capensis Cape Colony
cazorlense Cazorla, Spain
chalepensis Aleppo
chamaense Chama River (Venezuela)
chaparense Chapare, Bolivia
chilensis Chile
chilloense Chillo, Ecuador
colchichus Colchis (modern Georgia)
cretensis Crete

D
dumetorum, "of the thickets"

E
elymaitica'' Elymais
eystettensis Eichstätt

F
formosanus Taiwan

G
gandavensis Ghent
groenlandicus Greenland

H
hafniensis Copenhagen
halepensis Aleppo
helvetica Switzerland
hibernicus Ireland
hortensis "of the garden"
hyperboreus Arctic region

J
japonicus Japan

K
kentuckiensis Kentucky

L
lapponicus Lapland/Sápmi 
leydenensis Leyden
londinensis London
lugdunum Lyon

M
madagascariensis Madagascar
maigualidae - Sierra de Maigualida, Venezuela
malabaricus Malabar
mauretanicus Maghreb
monspessulanus Montpellier
monspeliensis Montpellier

N
neblinensis, Cerro de la Neblina or Sierra de la Neblina, Brazil–Venezuela border
nippon, nipponensis Japan
norvegicus Norway
novaeangliae New England
novaehollandiae Australia
novaeseelandiae New Zealand
noveboracensis New York
novoguineensis New Guinea

O
oelandica Öland

P
parisiense Paris
ponticus Pontus
pratensis "of the meadow"

R
rossicus Russia

S
sarawakensis Sarawak
schoenbrunnensis Schönbrunn Palace
septentrionalis Northern
sinensis China
sinicum China
surattensis India, Surat

T
tatarica Tatarstan and environs
terraenovae Newfoundland
thenensis Tienen
turolensis Diocese of Teruel in Spain
tianschanica Tian Shan mountain range

V
valdiviense , valdiviana - Valdivia
vallegrandense Vallegrande, Bolivia
vansittartense Vansittart Island, Tasmania
varsoviensis Warsaw
venezuelicum Venezuela
villaricense Villarica, Cotabato, Philippines
vindobonensis Vienna
virginianum Virginia
virginicum Virginia
vitiense Viti = Fiji
vitocense Vitoca, Peru

Y
yamobambense Yamobamba, Peru
yanamonense
yangambiense
yapacaniense 
yirrkalensis 
yolense
yungasense
yucatanum

Z
zamorense
zanzibarense
zeylanica Ceylon
zudanense
zumbense
zuurbergensis Zuurberg Mountains

See also
List of Latin and Greek words commonly used in systematic names
List of Latin place names in Africa

External links
Latin Place Names

Lists of Latin place names
Lists of cities by toponymy